The 1961 Census of India was the tenth in a series of censuses held in India every decade since 1872.

The population of India was counted as 438,936,918 people.

Population by state

Language data
The 1961 census recognized 1,652 mother tongues, counting all declarations made by any individual at the time when the census was conducted. However, the declaring individuals often mixed names of languages with those of dialects, sub-dialects and dialect clusters or even castes, professions, religions, localities, regions, countries and nationalities. The list therefore includes "languages" with barely a few individual speakers as well as 530 unclassified "mother tongues" and more than 100 idioms that are non-native to India, including linguistically unspecific demonyms such as "African", "Canadian" or "Belgian". Modifications were done by bringing in two additional components- place of birth i.e. village or town and duration of stay ( if born elsewhere).

See also
Demographics of India

References

External links

Census Of India, 1991
Censuses in India
Political history of India
India